The Barb (also called the English Barb) is a breed of fancy pigeon developed over many years of selective breeding. Barbs, along with other varieties of domesticated pigeons, are all descendants from the rock pigeon (a livia).
This breed was referred to by Shakespeare. It was also referred to with an illustration in Charles Darwin's Variation of Animals and Plants under Domestication.

See also 
List of pigeon breeds

References

Pigeon breeds